Cyclosa sierrae is an orb-weaver spider species found in Europe to Georgia.

See also 
 List of Araneidae species: B-F

References

External links 

Araneidae
Spiders of Europe
Spiders of Georgia (country)
Spiders described in 1870